1С:Enterprise is a development platform designed by 1C Company for the fast creation of easily customizable business automation software.

Overview  
1C:Enterprise is a full-stack, low-code platform that provides ready-to-use infrastructure and tools for rapid development of business applications, such as ERP, POS, WMS, or other custom corporate software.
1C:Enterprise uses a domain-driven design approach for developing business software. Application development within 1C:Enterprise is done using a high-level object-oriented language in a conceptual model that closely approximates business tasks.
Visual editing is used throughout the 1C:Enterprise development process. 1C Company claims that this keeps the volume of programming as such to a minimum, in keeping with the low-code development paradigm.
1C:Enterprise platform consists of the following parts:
 A data/process layer that provides system features, such as support for a variety of database management systems, an application server, web server components, and web services components.
 Business Components – predefined, visually configurable building blocks (templates) that are widely used in enterprise applications – catalogs, documents, ledgers, calculation processes, and configurable business process logic.

History

Versions for DOS 
Several versions for the DOS operation system were developed in the 1990s: 3.0, 4.0, then simultaneously 5.0 and 2.0 PROF (which is almost identical to v5.0 in terms of functionality). 2.0 PROF was available in single-user and multi-user versions (for collaboration over a local network). The principle of “working from the document” (the idea that operations performed in an application should seamlessly generate bureaucratically/legally-significant documents) was implemented in versions 5.0 and 2.0 PROF, along with the built-in programming language, accounting records, and printing form editor.

Version 6.0 
Version 6.0 for Windows 3.1 replaced version 5.0 in 1995. The new version had a lot in common with the DOS versions, but had a new core.

Versions 7.х (7.0, 7.5, 7.7) 
1С:Enterprise 7.0 and 1С:Enterprise 7.5 were evolutionally replaced by 1С:Enterprise 7.7. V7.7 consists of a runtime “wrapper”, i.e. an engine, which works with one or multiple databases defined in the application (“configuration” in 1C:Enterprise terms). Components that execute various accounting and administrative processes are plugged into the engine. Standard components include:
 Bookkeeping
 Operational accounting
 Payments
 Distributed infobase management
 Web extension

The built-in programming language used in v7.7 differs significantly from those used in versions 3.0-6.0. The “data objects” concept appeared for the first time in v7.7. The language became essentially universal (i.e., there are some examples of simple games – Tetris, checkers, etc. – being created on the 1C:Enterprise platform).

Versions 8.x 
The demo version of 1С:Enterprise 8.0 was launched on August 14, 2002. A year later, the first mass-market application – 1C:Enterprise 8.0 Trade Management – was released, which simultaneously marked the release of the 1C:Enterprise technology platform intended for mass-market use.[9]
1С:Enterprise 8 is localized into Russian, English, and Chinese, as well as a number of other languages (see Market Presence)

Version 8.2 
The key feature of v8.2 is the “managed application”: the user interface is described declaratively and depends on the type of client software:
 thick client (old client application from versions 8.0 and 8.1)
 thin client
 web client (includes both the client and the server; supports Internet Explorer, Mozilla Firefox, and, in later versions, Chrome, Safari, Microsoft Edge; web server runs on Apache or IIS). Client-server interaction is performed using AJAX (DHTML), XMLHttpRequest and JavaScript.

Version 8.3 
At the end of May 2013, 1C Company announced the release of 1C:Enterprise 8.3 with cloud functionality. This was positioned as the final – or most complete – version of the platform. 1C:Enterprise as a cloud platform consists of the following services and technologies:
 HTTP (HTTPS) connection to applications to provide remote access over the internet.
 Web client eliminates the need to install applications to client computers, providing remote access to applications from a variety of devices, including mobile.
 Fault-tolerant and scalable server cluster to support large numbers of concurrent users.
 Multitenancy support, through the data separation platform feature, enables the use of a single application instance by multiple customers.
 SaaS infrastructure enables software-as-a-service delivery of 1C:Enterprise applications. Application vendors can manage SaaS delivery of their applications, providing access to customers over the web. This model eliminates installation, update, hardware, and software costs for customers, as they only pay for using the application.

Enterprise Development Tools 
Along with ongoing development of v8.3 of the Enterprise platform, 1C Company offers a new version of the platform's development environment – the Eclipse-based Enterprise Development Tools (EDT).
EDT enjoys some advantages over the traditional 1C:Enterprise platform development environment:
 Collaborative design and versioning carried out through Git
 Configuration analysis in the form of ER-diagrams
 Information base and publication management on web servers is performed directly from the development environment 
 Application validation is performed immediately, in the process of altering application structure and editing modules
 Development tools can be customized using Eclipse plug-ins

Market presence 
A number of business applications – largely intended to automate business processes and various forms of reporting and documentation – have been developed on the 1C:Enterprise platform. According to a 2014 IDC study, 1C:Enterprise occupies a third of the Russian enterprise software market, second to SAP's 49 percent.

1C is expanding beyond the CIS and has been localised in more than 20 languages.

Countries of presence include US, Germany, Romania, Poland, Italy, Spain and Vietnam.

References 

System software